The 2017 NAB AFL Women's Under-18 Championships was played between May and July 2017, with six teams competing and with a further three playing in a two-match round-robin series as a de facto Division 2.

An Allies side (made up of players from the division two competition) was introduced as a division one team. This was designed to give the best prospects from those regions the opportunity to play at a national level in the division one carnival. Thus, division one was made up of six teams—Allies, NSW/ACT, Queensland, Vic Country, Vic Metro and Western Australia—playing each other across five rounds.

Vic Country was the only division one team to play four matches that went undefeated, making them the de facto tournament winners. Vic Metro's Madison Prespakis was named the tournament's best player, while Vic Country's Eden Zanker was the competition's leading goalkicker.

Fixture

Division 1

Division 2

All-Australian team
The 2017 Women's All-Australian team

Initial squad

 NSW/ACT: Alyce Parker, Georgia Breward, Haneen Zreika, Ellie Delgano-Fixture, Jordyn Jolliffe

 Northern Territory: Danielle Ponter

 Queensland: Kitara Farrar, Ruby Blair, Arianna Clarke, Courtney Bromage, Gabby Collingwood, Tarni White, Lauren Bella, Sophie Conway, Kalinda Howarth, Jemma Abott

 South Australia: Nikki Gore, Eloise Jones, Chloe Scheer, Jess Allen

 Tasmania: Mia King, Daria Bannister

 Vic Country: Rebecca Webster, Courtney Jones, Iilish Ross, Bridie Kennedy, Lucy McEvoy, Georgia Clarke, Darcy Guttridge, Tyla Hanks, Jordyn Allen, Aisling Tupper, Olivia Purcell, Georgia Gee, Rene Caris, Denby Taylor, Eden Zanker

 Vic Metro: Olivia Vesley, Georgia Ricardo, Georgia McPherson, Molly Warburton, Madison Prespakis, Maddy Guerin, Olivia Flanagan, Georgia Patrikios, Emerson Woods

 Western Australia: Sabreena Duffy, McKenzie Dowrick, Courtney Hodder, Sonia Dorizzi, Tayla McAuliffe, Emily McGuire, Kate Bartlett, Rosie Deegan

References

2017
2017 in Australian rules football
2017 in Australian women's sport